Njandukalude Nattil Oridavela is a 2017 Indian Malayalam-language dramedy film directed and co-written by Althaf Salim. It stars Nivin Pauly, Shanthi Krishna, Lal, Ahaana Krishna, and Aishwarya Lekshmi. The film is based on writer Chandramathi's memoirs of the same name, which narrates her long fight with cancer. Co-written by George Kora, the film was produced by Nivin under his home banner, Pauly Jr. Pictures. Njandukalude Nattil Oridavela released on 1 September 2017. Shanthi Krishna won several awards including Filmfare Award for Best Supporting Actress – Malayalam.

Plot 
Sheela Chacko has a doubt that she is developing cancer after finding a lump on her body. She discloses this to her husband Chacko and they contact their eldest son Kurien Chacko, settled in London, and force him to come back home, still without disclosing the secret. Kurien misunderstands that it was his marriage matter.

Chacko and Sheela decide to go for a checkup at Dr. Saiju's oncology clinic at Aster Medcity in Kochi, where Dr. Saiju tells them to come back after a few days when the results are available. Meanwhile, Kurien meets his old friend Subbu with whom he planned a supermarket chain but Subbu ending up being a supermarket owner on his own. A few days later, Dr. Saiju tells Sheela that she has Stage II breast cancer, but there isn't a problem and she can undergo chemotherapy. They realise they have to disclose the matter to the whole family, including Kurien, daughters Sarah and Mary, and son-in-law Tony Edayady.

Everybody in the family goes gloomy and they agree for chemotherapy sessions including a lump removal surgery. In one of the chemotherapy sessions, as Chacko was petrified about going with Sheela, Kurien goes instead and there he meets Rachel in a funny situation. They then get to know each other and also that they have similar situations.

They meet occasionally and Rachel tricks Kurien by asking whether he wants to be her boyfriend. Kurien agrees but then realises she deceived him and decides not to marry. Meanwhile, Sheela starts losing her hair as a side effect. So, she trims her head and temporarily quits her lecturing job. So, they decide to conduct Sara's engagement. At that occasion, Sara asks Kurien if Sheela has the confidence to go through the disease. Then Kurien explains a story about her during the Gulf War in 1990. Iraqi soldiers invaded Kuwait and they somehow escape to India via Jordan without her confidence going down even by a little bit.

One day, she develops a fever and the children take her to the hospital thinking it as serious. But, she comes out fine and Kurien goes to home alone where 'Appachan' (Grandfather) was alone. He asks for a piece of orange but as Kurien was obsessed with Lays, he decides to give him some Lays. As he bursts open the Lays packet, simultaneously the room blacks out with a deafening sound of the Thunder outside. 80-year-old Appappan dies instantly in the sudden shock. After that the family plans for a trip to Kodaikanal and when they reach there, Kurien gets a call from the doctor. He smiles after attending the call, signifying that Sheela has been cured of the disease. The following scenes show flashbacks where each family member cried behind closed doors, hiding their tears from Sheela. The last scene of the movie shows Kurien crying and when Sheela calls him, he wipes his tears and goes. In the end of the film, Kurien marries Rachel.

Cast 

 Nivin Pauly as Kurien Chacko
 Lal as Chacko
 Shanthi Krishna as Sheela Chacko
 Siju Wilson as Tony Edayady
 Srinda Arhaan as Mary Tony
 Aishwarya Lekshmi as Rachel
 Ahaana Krishna as Sarah Chacko
 Baby Kalyani as Riya
Antony Chachan as Chachan
 Saiju Kurup as Dr. Saiju
 Dileesh Pothan as Dr.Abraham
 Krishna Shankar as Subbu
 Sharaf U Dheen as Yesudas	
George Kora as Mathew
Jayalakshmi as Lakshmi
Vijay Suresh as Vijay
 Sidhartha Siva as Kurien's friend
 Omana Ouseph as Tony's mother
Shiny Rajan as Geetha
Dr.Ramkumar as Rachel's father
Harish as Security
George V as Lift operator
Ashok Menon as Priest
Dr.Ramesh as Rameshan
 Mukesh (cameo)
 Akshay Ramesh as Guy caught watching it.

Production 
Director Salim co-wrote the film with George Kora. Principal photography of the film began on 25 September 2016. Mukesh Muraleedharan was the cinematographer. The film is inspired from author Chandramathi's book of the same name, about her cancer survival. Salim calls the film a dramedy, because it is "a family drama that deals with a pertinent social issue but told with lots of humour. That's why we like to call the film a dramedy". The film marks Shanthi Krishna's return to acting after a 19-year hiatus.

Soundtrack 

Justin Varghese has composed the music and background score in his feature film debut.

Release 
The film was released on 1 September 2017 in about 108 screens across Kerala.

Box office 
The film was a commercial success. The film grossed around 20 crore from Kerala box office. The film collected  in its two weekends from Chennai box office. The film collected $33,825 and $667,344 from UK and UAE box office respectively from its first weekend.

References

External links
 

2010s Malayalam-language films
Indian films about cancer
Indian comedy-drama films
Indian family films
Films shot in London
Films shot in Kochi
Films shot in Kodaikanal
Films based on books